Fleta is a medieval treatise on the common law of England.

Fleta may also refer to:
Fleet Prison (by its medieval Latin name)
Fleta (moth), a moth genus in the family Noctuidae

Surname
Ignacio Fleta, (1897–1977), Spanish luthier
Miguel Fleta (1897–1938), Spanish tenor

Given name
Fleta Jan Brown Spencer (1882–1938), American songwriter, composer, pianist and singer

Nickname
Fleta (gamer), professional esports player Kim Byung-sun